{{DISPLAYTITLE:C45H73NO15}}
The molecular formula C45H73NO15 (molar mass: 868.06 g/mol, exact mass: 867.4980 u) may refer to:

 Solamargine
 Solanine

Molecular formulas